Peter O'Brien (1842 – September 30, 1898) was an American soldier who fought in the American Civil War. O'Brien received his country's highest award for bravery during combat, the Medal of Honor. O'Brien's medal was won for capturing a Confederate flag, and an officer with his horse and equipment, at the Battle of Waynesboro, Virginia, on March 2, 1865. He was honored with the award on March 26, 1865.

O'Brien was born in Dublin, Ireland. He joined the US Army from New York City in August 1861, and mustered out with his regiment in June 1865. He was later buried in Rosehill Cemetery, Chicago, Illinois.

Medal of Honor citation

See also
List of American Civil War Medal of Honor recipients: G–L

References

1842 births
1898 deaths
American Civil War recipients of the Medal of Honor
Burials in Illinois
Irish emigrants to the United States (before 1923)
Irish-born Medal of Honor recipients
People of New York (state) in the American Civil War
Union Army soldiers
United States Army Medal of Honor recipients
Military personnel from Dublin (city)